Platyptilia sedata is a moth of the family Pterophoridae. It is found in the Kashmir region of what was British India.

References

Moths described in 1932
sedata
Endemic fauna of India
Moths of Asia